Martin Benson may refer to:

 Martin Benson (actor) (1918–2010), English character actor
 Martin Benson (bishop) (1689–1752), English churchman, archdeacon of Berkshire and bishop of Gloucester
 Martin H. Benson (1879–1972), co-founder of the bookmaker Douglas Stewart
 Martin Benson, character in comedy novels by Michael Carson